St. Mary's Church (in full, the Church of St. Mary the Virgin), Putney, is an Anglican church in Putney, London, sited next to the River Thames, beside the southern approach to Putney Bridge. There has been a centre of Christian worship on this site from at least the 13th century, and the church is still very active today. It is also noteworthy because in 1647, during the English Civil War, the church was the site of the Putney Debates on the English constitution. It has been Grade II* listed since 1955.

The building itself has seen many changes; parts of the existing church have survived from medieval times, such as the 15th-century tower and some of the nave arcading, and the early 16th-century Bishop West Chapel, built by Bishop Nicholas West. Most of the building, however, dates from the substantial reconstruction of 1836 to the designs of Edward Lapidge. He largely rebuilt the body of the church in yellow brick with stone dressings and perpendicular windows. Some of the medieval pillars and arches in the nave were retained, but both the north and the south arcades were widened.

In 1973 an arson attack resulted in the gutting of much of the church. Rebuilding was not completed until nearly ten years later, when the church was rehallowed by Rt. Revd. Michael Marshall the Bishop of Woolwich, on 6 February 1982. Since the restoration, the altar has not been positioned, as is usual, in the chancel or even at the eastern end of the nave, but instead halfway down the northern side of the nave, with the seating arranged to reflect this. The architect of the restoration was Ronald Sims. The pipe organ is by the Danish firm of Marcussen & Søn.

Inscribed on a wall of the church is a quote from the Putney debates (1647) by Colonel Thomas Rainsborough:

In 2005 a new extension to the church, the "Brewer Building", built at a cost of £1.7m was opened by the Bishop of Southwark.

St. Mary's is one of the two churches in the Parish of Putney, the other being All Saints' Church, Putney Common. The parish is within the Wandsworth Deanery, the Kingston Episcopal Area and the Diocese of Southwark. From 2000 to 2009, the Rev. Giles Fraser was the Team Rector of St. Mary's, where he campaigned to raise the profile of the Putney Debates (1647).

Notable people associated with St Mary's 

 Samuel Pepys mentions St. Mary's in his diary for 1667.  He attended a service where he heard 'a good sermon'.  He saw the girls of the school, 'few of which were pretty'.
 Nicholas West (1461 – 28 April 1533), bishop and diplomat, was born at Putney, and educated at Eton and at King's College, Cambridge, of which he became a fellow in 1486. He built two beautiful chapels, one in St. Mary's and the other in Ely Cathedral, where he is buried.
 Thomas Cromwell, born in Putney, was Chancellor of the Exchequer between 1533 and 1540.
 Charles Dickens made St. Mary's the setting for David Copperfield's marriage to Dora Spenlow.

References

External links 

 
 

1973 fires in the United Kingdom
Putney
Grade II* listed churches in London
Grade II* listed buildings in the London Borough of Wandsworth
Putney
Rebuilt churches in the United Kingdom
Religious buildings and structures in the United Kingdom destroyed by arson
Putney
Churches on the Thames